Mitani Takanobu (June 17, 1892 – January 13, 1985) was a Japanese Home Ministry government official. He was born in Kyoto Prefecture. He graduated from the University of Tokyo. He was a Christian. He was Ambassador of Japan to France. He was Grand Chamberlain of Japan (1948–1965).

Family
Keiichiro Asao, maternal grandson

External links

三谷隆信の墓

1892 births
1985 deaths
Ambassadors of Japan to France
Japanese Home Ministry government officials
Japanese Christians
University of Tokyo alumni
Politicians from Kyoto Prefecture